The 2020 Bangkok Challenger II was a professional tennis tournament played on hard courts. It was part of the 2020 ATP Challenger Tour. It took place in Bangkok, Thailand between 20 and 26 January 2020.

Singles main-draw entrants

Seeds

 1 Rankings are as of 13 January 2020.

Other entrants
The following players received wildcards into the singles main draw:
  Thanapet Chanta
  Palaphoom Kovapitukted
  Michael Mathayomchand
  Kasidit Samrej
  Wishaya Trongcharoenchaikul

The following player received entry into the singles main draw using a protected ranking:
  Arthur De Greef

The following players received entry into the singles main draw as alternates:
  Alex Molčan
  Filip Peliwo
  Kaichi Uchida
 
The following players received entry from the qualifying draw:
  Mirza Bašić
  Aslan Karatsev

Champions

Singles

  Federico Gaio def.  Robin Haase 6–1, 4–6, 4–2 ret.

Doubles

  Gonzalo Escobar /  Miguel Ángel Reyes-Varela def.  Gong Maoxin /  Zhang Ze 6–3, 6–3.

References

 
2020 ATP Challenger Tour
Tennis, ATP Challenger Tour, Bangkok Challenger II
Tennis, ATP Challenger Tour, Bangkok Challenger II
2020
Tennis, ATP Challenger Tour, Bangkok Challenger II